Lücker is a surname. Notable people with the surname include: 

 Alfred Lücker (1931–2008), German field hockey player
 Arno Lücker (born 1979), German composer, musicologist, music critic and music dramaturge
 Martin Lücker (born 1953), German classical organist and academic
 Monika Lücker (born 1944), Swiss luger

German-language surnames